The California Botanical Society was founded by Willis Linn Jepson in 1913, since when it has advanced the knowledge of botanical sciences in the Western United States

Services
The society services are: the journal Madroño, published since 1916; annual banquets in various California locations along with educational lectures; research support on green plants of Baja California, (enabled by the Annetta Carter Memorial Fund);  graduate student support (together with the annual banquet); and community discussions with professional botanists.

Journal 
Madroño is the quarterly peer-reviewed scientific journal of the Society. It was established in 1916 and focuses on botany in the western part of North America. Articles are published in English or Spanish. The current editor is Matt Ritter (California Polytechnic State University).

See also 
 University and Jepson Herbaria
 Cneoridium dumosum (Nuttall) Hooker F. Collected March 26, 1960, at an Elevation of about 1450 Meters on Cerro Quemazón, 15 Miles South of Bahía de Los Angeles, Baja California, México, Apparently for a Southeastward Range Extension of Some 140 Miles

References

External links 
 
 

1913 establishments in California
Botanical societies
Environmental organizations based in California
Organizations established in 1913
Scientific societies based in the United States